Manmaw is a village in Homalin Township, Hkamti District, in the Sagaing Region of northwestern Burma. Its geographical coordinates are 25° 4' 0" North, 95° 4' 0" East and it is located on a tributary of the Chindwin River, southeast of Maungkan.

References

External links
Maplandia World Gazetteer

Populated places in Hkamti District
Homalin Township